Chocolate milk is a milk drink flavored with chocolate.

Chocolate milk may also refer to:

Chocolate Milk (band), a 1970s funk band from New Orleans
Chocolate Milk (album), a 1995 album by Charles and Eddie
"Chocolate Milk" (Brooklyn Nine-Nine), a television episode

See also
:Category:Chocolate drinks